Eurema leuce, the Hall's sulphur, is a butterfly in the family Pieridae. It is found on the West Indies and in Brazil, Uruguay, Colombia, and Venezuela.

The length of the forewings is 17–21 mm for males and females. Adults have been recorded feeding on Bidens pilosa, Tournefortia hirsutissima, and Croton barahonensis.

Subspecies
The following subspecies are recognised:
E. l. leuce (Brazil: Rio Grande do Sul, Uruguay)
E. l. circumcincta (Bates, 1861) (Brazil: Pará)
E. l. athalia (C. & R. Felder, [1865]) (Colombia, Venezuela, Trinidad)
E. l. flavilla (Bates, 1861) (Brazil: Amazonas), Peru)
E. l. memulus (Butler, 1871) (Haiti)
E. l. antillarum (Hall, 1936) (St. Kitts, Dominica, St. Lucia, Puerto Rico)

References

leuce
Pieridae of South America
Lepidoptera of the Caribbean
Lepidoptera of Brazil
Lepidoptera of Colombia
Lepidoptera of Venezuela
Fauna of the Amazon
Butterflies described in 1836
Taxa named by Jean Baptiste Boisduval